Sir Thomas Miller, 1st Baronet of Chichester (c. 1635–1705), of North Street, Chichester, Sussex, was an English politician.

He was a Member (MP) of the Parliament of England for Chichester in 1689 and 1690.

References

1635 births
1705 deaths
People from Chichester
Baronets in the Baronetage of England
English MPs 1689–1690
English MPs 1690–1695